Johnny Helsing (born 8 October 1955) is a Swedish weightlifter. He competed in the men's bantamweight event at the 1980 Summer Olympics.

References

External links
 

1955 births
Living people
Swedish male weightlifters
Olympic weightlifters of Sweden
Weightlifters at the 1980 Summer Olympics
People from Hofors Municipality
Sportspeople from Gävleborg County
20th-century Swedish people